Slavia Sofia, a Bulgarian football team, played in the 2013-14 seasons of the A PFG and Bulgarian Cup.

Competitions

A Group

First phase

Table

Results summary

Matches

Relegation group

Table

Results summary

Bulgarian Cup

PFC Slavia Sofia seasons
Slavia Sofia